Bhawanrao Shriniwasrao Pant Pratinidhi  (October 24, 1868 –  April 13, 1951), popularly known as Balasaheb Pant Pratinidhi or Bhawanrao Balasaheb Pant Pratinidhi, was the ruler of the princely state of Aundh of British Raj during the reign (1909 – 1947).

He is known for inventing the exercise sequence of Surya Namaskar, Salute to the Sun, now incorporated into modern yoga as exercise.

Life

Bhawanrao Shriniwasrao was born to Shriniwasrao Parashuram "Anna Sahib" (7th Raja of Aundh) on 24 October 1868 in a Deshastha Brahmin family. He studied at Satara High School and completed his Bachelor of Arts in Deccan College of University of Bombay in Pune. He ascended the throne as the Raja of Aundh State  on 4 November 1909. Although Balasaheb was not a scholar, he was avid reader and his Sanskrit was tolerably good. He worked as Chief Secretary to his father from 1895-1901 in order to learn the Administration of the State.

Aundh Experiment
The Aundh Experiment was an early test of village-level self-government initiated by Balasaheb.  Unusual at that time, he relinquished most of his powers as a ruler of a princely state to his populace in 1938 on his seventieth birthday. This declaration was followed up by the adoption of a Swaraj (self-rule) Constitution in January 1939, formulated in consultation with Mahatma Gandhi and Maurice Frydman. For Gandhi, Aundh’s small, rural base suggested the possibilities of testing his cherished idea of gram-rajya or village republics; broadly, this idea entailed treating the village as an autonomous and self-sufficient administrative and economic unit.

Family
His second son Appa Sahib Pant (1912-1992) served as Indian ambassador in many countries. Appa 
was honored by Government of India in 1954, with the award of Padma Shri, the fourth highest Indian civilian award for his contributions to the society, placing him among the first recipients of the award.

Patron of arts, literature, and physical education

Bhawanrao was a man of letters, an accomplished painter, and an erudite musical kirtankar.He was patrons for many artists including the polymath, Shripad Damodar Satwalekar.In addition Satwalekar, he provided patronage to many other artists from e Jamsetjee Jeejebhoy School of Art of Arts. He presided over Marathi Sahitya Sammelan held in Indore in 1935. He also served as  President of the Poona Sarvajanik Sabha.

Balasaheb was also an avid bodybuilder, and a devotee of the teaching of the European muscle-man Eugen Sandow (1867–1925). In the 1920s, he popularised the flowing sequences of salute to the sun, Surya Namaskar, containing popular asanas such as Uttanasana and upward and downward dog poses, helping to shape yoga as exercise.

Shri Bhavani Museum
Balasaheb was an avid collector, patron and commissioner of arts. He set up a museum on the Yamai temple hill in Aundh to hold his art  collection. The museum has the distinction of being one of the first art museums in India to be set up by an Indian as an Art Museum rather than as a museum of archeological artifacts.

The museum collection includes paintings and sculptures of various well-known  artists including Raja Ravi Varma and the famous "Mother and Child" stone structure by Henry Moore. It also has various works of art by former alumni of the J.J. school of art such as M. V. Dhurandhar, and Madhav Satwalekar The museum includes a collection of paintings by Dhurandhar on the life of the founder of Maratha empire Shivaji which was commissioned by Balasaheb in 1926. The museum also holds works from the Bengal school. The collection includes casts and copies of many popular western classical sculptures and paintings.
There is a small collection of Indian paintings from the pre-modern period especially of the Kangra or Pahadi style.

Literary contributions

 The Chitra Ramayana or Picture Ramayana (1916) - Balasaheb published and illustrated he book.
 The Ten-Point Way To Health: Surya Namaskars (1928)
 Surya namaskaramulu (1928) Telugu translation.
 Ajanta (1932)
 Surya Namaskar (1939) Gujarati translation.
Surya Namaskars (1940)
Surya Namaskar (1973) Hindi translation.

See also
 Pant Pratinidhi family
 Aundh State
 Aundh Experiment

References

Sources

External links

 http://iopinionmaker.blogspot.com/2008/09/blog-post_1477.html
 http://www.loksatta.com/daily/20031026/lmvish.htm

Indian male painters
1951 deaths
Maharajas of Maharashtra
1868 births
19th-century Indian painters
20th-century Indian painters
Marathi people
Painters from Maharashtra
Presidents of the Akhil Bharatiya Marathi Sahitya Sammelan
19th-century Indian male artists
20th-century Indian male artists